Walton & Anfield railway station was located near Goodison Park on the Canada Dock Branch to east side of Walton Lane in Walton, Liverpool, England.

History
The station opened on 1 July 1870 and closed to passengers on 31 May 1948.

The site came to national attention in 1993 for being near to the scene where the toddler James Bulger was found dead, after having been abducted and murdered by two boys.

Merseytravel have held talks about re-opening the Canada Dock Branch to passengers.

In 2017 traces of the platforms could still be seen. Freight trains to and from Seaforth Dock still pass through the station site. It was announced in December 2019 that Liverpool City Council had commissioned a feasibility study to see about reopening the Canada Dock Branch to passenger traffic.

References

Sources

External links
 The station's history Disused Stations
 The station and local lines on multiple maps Rail Maps Online
 The station on an Edwardian 25" OS map National Library of Scotland
 The branch with stations and mileages Railway Codes

Disused railway stations in Liverpool
Former London and North Western Railway stations
Railway stations in Great Britain opened in 1870
Railway stations in Great Britain closed in 1948